Stephen Russell Braun (born May 8, 1948) is an American former professional baseball left fielder, third baseman, and designated hitter. He played in Major League Baseball (MLB) for the Minnesota Twins, Seattle Mariners, Kansas City Royals, Toronto Blue Jays, and St. Louis Cardinals.

Braun played prep baseball at Hopewell Valley Central High School.

Career
Braun was drafted by the Twins in the 10th round of the 1966 Major League Baseball draft.  He did not play baseball in 1968 or 1969 as he was on baseball's military list from September 6, 1967, until September 23, 1969.  Braun made his Major League Baseball debut with the Minnesota Twins on April 6, . He appeared in his final regular season game on October 6, .

Braun was traded from the Mariners to the Royals for Jim Colborn on May 31, 1978. He was a member of the St. Louis Cardinals team that defeated the Milwaukee Brewers in the 1982 World Series.

He is one of the few players with over 100 pinch hits.

In 1425 games over 15 seasons, Braun compiled a .271 batting average with 466 runs, 155 doubles, 19 triples, 52 home runs, 388 RBI, 579 base on balls, 433 strikeouts, .371 on-base percentage, and .367 slugging percentage. Defensively, he recorded a .960 fielding percentage.

References

External links
, or Retrosheet
Pura Pelota (Venezuelan Winter League)

1948 births
Living people
American expatriate baseball players in Canada
Baseball players from Trenton, New Jersey
Florida Instructional League Twins players
Gulf Coast Twins players
Hopewell Valley Central High School alumni
Kansas City Royals players
Leones del Caracas players
Louisville Redbirds players
Lynchburg Twins players
Major League Baseball designated hitters
Major League Baseball left fielders
Major League Baseball third basemen
Minnesota Twins players
Navegantes del Magallanes players
American expatriate baseball players in Venezuela
St. Louis Cardinals coaches
St. Louis Cardinals players
Seattle Mariners players
Syracuse Chiefs players
Toronto Blue Jays players
Wisconsin Rapids Twins players